Vivek Rao is a leading Canadian cardiac surgeon and researcher. He was the youngest faculty member ever to join the University of Toronto cardiac surgery division, and, later, the second youngest chief of cardiac surgery ever appointed at the University Health Network Division of Cardiac Surgery. 

Rao is credited with building Canada's largest Advanced Heat Failure Program. He was also the first cardiovascular surgeon in Canada to implant HeartMate, a mechanical heart technology he imported from his experience under Dr. Mehmet Oz of the "Dr. Oz Show" in New York.

After attending Upper Canada College, Rao studied medicine at Queen's University and University of Toronto.

Rao was named to Canada's Top 40 Under 40.

References

Living people
Year of birth missing (living people)
Canadian cardiologists